The Nebraska Statewide Arboretum is a network of nearly 100 arboreta, botanical gardens, parks, and other public landscapes in 56 communities across Nebraska, and supported by the arboretum office at the University of Nebraska in Lincoln, Nebraska. The arboretum was founded in 1978 as a partnership with the University of Nebraska-Lincoln Institute of Agriculture and Natural Resources and is an affiliate of the Center for Plant Conservation.

The Nebraska Statewide Arboretum promotes and sells native plants as part of a goal to create environmentally-sustainable landscapes across the state.

Some of its larger collections include sites at Omaha's Metropolitan Community College at Fort Omaha, Joslyn Castle, Swanson Science Park, the Blair Community Arboretum (Steyer Park, Black Elk Park, and the Dana College campus), Gilman Park Arboretum in Pierce, and Clemmons Park Arboretum in Fremont.

See also
 List of botanical gardens in the United States

References

External links
 Nebraska Statewide Arboretum
 Nebraska Forest Service

Arboreta in Nebraska
Botanical gardens in Nebraska
1978 establishments in Nebraska